Kristie Joy Johnston (born 22 December 1980) is an Australian politician. She was elected as the Mayor of City of Glenorchy in 2014 and 2018 and is an Independent member for the seat of Division of Clark, having been elected in the 2021 Tasmanian state election.

Political career 
Johnston was first elected in 2014 as the mayor of the City of Glenorchy, winning 59% of the vote against incumbent mayor Stuart Slade. In 2015, Johnston claimed that the city council had breached regulations by voting on making 16 employees redundant without her presence. Federal independent MP for the Division of Denison, Andrew Wilkie, who endorsed Johnston for mayor, criticised this as "puerile behaviour", saying that some aldermen were "sore losers" and trying to create an impression of chaos under Johnston's mayoralty. She was re-elected in 2018 as mayor, winning 86.4% of the vote.

In a press release on 27 February 2021, Johnston announced she would run for the seat of Clark in the next Tasmanian state election. A snap election was ultimately called a month later, with the election date set for 1 May 2021. After the counting of final preferences, Johnston won the final seat in Clark with 11% of the primary vote.  Johnston's win was the first time an independent candidate had won a seat in the House of Assembly since Bruce Goodluck in 1996.

In March 2022 Johnston said of the Tasmanian Integrity Commission, that there is "snowball's chance in hell that this government will move to reform and strengthen the Integrity Commission in Tasmania".

References

Independent members of the Parliament of Tasmania
Living people
Tasmanian local councillors
University of Tasmania alumni
Members of the Tasmanian House of Assembly
Women members of the Tasmanian House of Assembly
21st-century Australian politicians
21st-century Australian women politicians
Mayors of places in Tasmania
1980 births
Women local councillors in Australia
Women mayors of places in Tasmania